The 2022 GT Cup Open Europe was the fourth season of the GT Cup Open Europe, the grand tourer-style sports car racing series founded by the Spanish GT Sport Organización. It began on 22 May at the Circuit Paul Ricard and ended on 16 October at the Circuit de Barcelona-Catalunya after five double-header meetings.

Race calendar

Entry List

Results 
Bold indicates overall winner.

External links 

 Official website

References 

GT Cup Open Europe seasons
GT Cup Open Europe